An A-type main-sequence star (A) or A dwarf star is a main-sequence (hydrogen burning) star of spectral type A and luminosity class  (five). These stars have spectra defined by strong hydrogen Balmer absorption lines. They measure between 1.4 and 2.1 solar masses and have surface temperatures between 7,600 and 10,000 K. Bright and nearby examples are Altair (A7), Sirius A (A1), and Vega (A0). A-type stars do not have convective zones and thus are not expected to harbor magnetic dynamos. As a consequence, because they do not have strong stellar winds, they lack a means to generate X-ray emissions.

Incidentally, the fastest moving star known so far as of 2023, S5-HVS1, which is traveling at the speed  in the galactic frame, belongs to this class.

Spectral standard stars

The revised Yerkes Atlas system listed a dense grid of A-type dwarf spectral standard stars, but not all of these have survived to this day as standards. The "anchor points" and "dagger standards" of the MK spectral classification system among the A-type main-sequence dwarf stars, i.e. those standard stars that have remained unchanged over years and can be considered to define the system, are Vega (A0 V), Gamma Ursae Majoris (A0 V), and Fomalhaut (A3 V). The seminal review of MK classification by Morgan & Keenan (1973) didn't provide any dagger standards between types A3 V and F2 V. HD 23886 was suggested as an A5 V standard in 1978.

Richard Gray & Robert Garrison provided the most recent contributions to the A dwarf spectral sequence in a pair of papers in 1987 and 1989. They list an assortment of fast- and slow-rotating A-type dwarf spectral standards, including HD 45320 (A1 V), HD 88955 (A2 V), 2 Hydri (A7 V), 21 Leonis Minoris (A7 V), and 44 Ceti (A9 V). Besides the MK standards provided in Morgan's papers and the Gray & Garrison papers, one also occasionally sees Delta Leonis (A4 V) listed as a standard. There are no published A6 V and A8 V standard stars.

Planets 
A-type stars are young (typically few hundred million years old) and many emit infrared (IR) radiation beyond what would be expected from the star alone. This IR excess is attributable to dust emission from a debris disk where planets form.
Surveys indicate massive planets commonly form around A-type stars although these planets are difficult to detect using the Doppler spectroscopy method. This is because A-type stars typically rotate very quickly, which makes it difficult to measure the small Doppler shifts induced by orbiting planets since the spectral lines are very broad. However, this type of massive star eventually evolves into a cooler red giant which rotates more slowly and thus can be measured using the radial velocity method. As of early 2011 about 30 Jupiter class planets have been found around evolved K-giant stars including Pollux, Gamma Cephei and Iota Draconis. Doppler surveys around a wide variety of stars indicate about 1 in 6 stars having twice the mass of the Sun are orbited by one or more Jupiter-sized planets, compared to about 1 in 16 for Sun-like stars.

A-type star systems known to feature planets include Fomalhaut, HD 15082, Beta Pictoris, HR 8799 and HD 95086.

Examples 
Within 40 light years:

Delta Capricorni is likely a subgiant or giant star, and Altair is a disputed subgiant.  In addition, Sirius is the brightest star in the night sky.

See also 
 Star count, survey of stars
 B-type main-sequence star

References

Star types